Bank of England Act is a stock short title used in the United Kingdom for legislation relating to the Bank of England.

List
The Bank of England Act 1946 (9 & 10 Geo 6 c 27)
The Bank of England Act 1998 (c 11)

The Bank of England Acts 1694 to 1892 is the collective title of the following Acts:
The Bank of England Act 1694 (5 & 6 Will & Mar c 20)
The Bank of England Act 1696 (8 & 9 Will 3 c 20)
The Bank of England Act 1708 (7 Ann c 7)
The Bank of England Act 1709 (8 Ann c 1)
The Bank of England Act 1716 (3 Geo 1 c 8)
The Bank of England Act 1727 (1 Geo 2 Stat 2 c 8)
The Bank of England Act 1728 (2 Geo 2 c 3)
The Bank of England Act 1741 (15 Geo 2 c 13)
The Bank of England Act 1745 (19 Geo 2 c 6)
The Bank of England Act 1750 (24 Geo 2 c 4)
The Bank of England Act 1800 (39 & 40 Geo 3 c 28) 
The Bank of England Act 1816 (56 Geo 3 c 96)
The Bank of England Act 1819 (59 Geo 3 c 76)
The Bank of England Act 1833 (3 & 4 Will 4 c 98)
The Bank Charter Act 1844 (7 & 8 Vict c 32)
The Bank Notes Act 1852 (16 & 17 Vict c 2)
The Bank of England Act 1861 (24 & 25 Vict c 3)
The Bank of England (Election of Directors) Act 1872 (35 & 36 Vict c 34)
The Bank Act 1892 (55 & 56 Vict c 48)

See also
List of short titles

References

Lists of legislation by short title and collective title
Bank of England